King River may refer to:

Communities
King River, the former name of Centerville, Fresno County, California, United States
King River, Western Australia, a town in Western Australia

Watercourse
King River (Northern Territory), a river in the Northern Territory, Australia
King River (Queensland), a river in Queensland, Australia
King River (Tasmania), a river in Tasmania, Australia
King River (Victoria), a river in Victoria, Australia
King River (Kimberley region, Western Australia), a river in the Kimberley region of Western Australia
King River (Western Australia), a river in Western Australia

See also 
Kings River (disambiguation)
King (disambiguation)
King Lake (disambiguation)